José Luis Falcón (born 19 July 1938) is a Spanish athlete. He competed in the men's hammer throw at the 1960 Summer Olympics.

References

External links
 

1938 births
Living people
Athletes (track and field) at the 1960 Summer Olympics
Spanish male hammer throwers
Olympic athletes of Spain
People from Oiartzun
20th-century Spanish people
21st-century Spanish people